Peak 4030 is a mountain summit, the tallest in the Nulato Hills, in the U.S. state of Alaska. It is located in the Yukon–Koyukuk Census Area.

References

Mountains of Alaska
Landforms of Yukon–Koyukuk Census Area, Alaska
North American 1000 m summits